
Gmina Jabłonna Lacka is a rural gmina (administrative district) in Sokołów County, Masovian Voivodeship, in east-central Poland.

Villages
Gmina Jabłonna Lacka contains the villages and settlements of Bujały-Gniewosze, Bujały-Mikosze, Czekanów, Dzierzby Szlacheckie, Dzierzby Włościańskie, Gródek, Gródek-Dwór, Jabłonna Lacka, Jabłonna Średnia, Jabłonna-Kolonia, Krzemień-Wieś, Krzemień-Zagacie, Łuzki, Łuzki-Kolonia, Mołożew-Wieś, Morszków, Niemirki, Nowomodna, Stara Jabłonna, Teofilówka, Toczyski Podborne, Toczyski Średnie, Tończa, Wierzbice-Guzy, Wierzbice-Strupki, Wieska-Wieś and Wirów.

Neighbouring gminas
Gmina Jabłonna Lacka is bordered by the gminas of Ciechanowiec, Drohiczyn, Perlejewo, Repki, Sabnie, Sokołów Podlaski and Sterdyń.

References

Polish official population figures 2006

Jablonna Lacka
Sokołów County